Solid earth refers to "the earth beneath our feet" or terra firma, the planet's solid surface and its interior. It contrasts with the Earth's fluid envelopes, the atmosphere and hydrosphere (but includes the ocean basin), as well as the biosphere and interactions with the Sun. It includes the liquid core.

Solid-earth science refers to the corresponding methods of study, a subset of Earth sciences, predominantly geophysics and geology, excluding aeronomy, atmospheric sciences, oceanography, hydrology, and ecology.

See also 
 Ad cœlum
 Crust (geology)
 Earth's crust
 Geosphere
 Land
 Landform
 Landscape
 Lithosphere
 Pedosphere
 Structure of the Earth
 Terrain
 Solid Earth (journal)
 Journal of Geophysical Research - section B (Solid Earth)

References

Further reading 

Earth sciences